Abdullah Al Muharraqi is a Bahraini painter considered a founder of modern art in the Persian Gulf region.

Biography 
He was born in Manama, Bahrain in 1939 and spent his childhood on its shores. His father was captain of a mail ship operating between Qatar and Saudi Arabia, and his mother was a painter. Although his parents believed that “art was not compatible with customs and traditions,” he enrolled at the Faculty of Fine Arts in Cairo after creating an impressive portrait of Anwar Sadat, earning his degree in decorative arts in 1967. In addition to painting, Muharraqi has published political cartoons in the Bahraini daily newspaper Akhbar Al Khaleej.

Art 
Muharraqi is a celebrated artist among collectors in the Gulf Cooperation Council, and he has an entire wing dedicated to his work at the Mathaf: Arab Museum of Modern Art in Qatar.

References 

Bahraini artists
People from Manama
Cartoonists